Akleem Akhtar (1931/1932 – 1 July 2002) also known as General Rani was the mistress of Pakistani President and Dictator, General Yahya Khan. Some considered her Pakistan's most powerful woman during his regime.

Early life
Akhtar was born in Gujrat in Punjab, British India, in 1931 or 1932, to a conservative middle-class family. During her childhood, she was considered intelligent and was reported to enjoy outdoor sports. 

Her parents married her off to a police officer twice her age, Moiz Jee, an inhabitant of North Karachi. They had six children. In 1963, when on holiday in the hills of Murree, Akhtar rebelled against her husband by removing her niqab. The marriage ended in a divorce, with their six children leaving with Akhtar. After her parents denied her help unless she returned to her husband, she planned to associate with powerful, wealthy men. 

Akhtar reportedly adopted the motto 'miyan ki juti miyan ke sar', 'beat men at their own game', and started a prostitution business. Akhtar maintained she only played a background role, acting as a mother figure to the young girls which she provided to rich and powerful men.

Relationship with General Yahya Khan
She became acquainted with rich and powerful men through frequenting clubs with her former husband, through which she met General Khan. Akhtar created a close relationship with the General, who she reportedly called 'Agha Jani'. She held no official position in his circle but was given special privileges due to their association. She denied being Khan's mistress, claiming their relationship was merely that of friends. She said in one interview that she exploited the Khan's weaknesses: alcohol and women.

Akhtar was also known as General Rani, 'General's Queen'. Rani was Akhtar's alias, and she was called General by the people and media due to her inclusion in the inner circle of General Yahya Khan during his military rule in Pakistan between 1969 and 1971. Several bureaucrats and politicians approached Akhtar in an attempt to receive General Yahya Khan's attention.

Death and legacy
In May 2002, Pakistani media reported Akhtar had breast cancer that metastasised in her liver and kidney. She died on the 1st of July 2002 at Shaikh Zayed Hospital in Lahore​ after fighting cancer for five years.

Akhtar is the mother of a Pakistani journalist Aroosa Alam, and also the grandmother of a Pakistani pop star Fakhar-e-Alam.

See also
Joanne Herring
Cynthia D. Ritchie

References

1930s births
2002 deaths
People from Gujrat District
Mistresses
Pakistani brothel owners and madams
Pakistani sex workers